The 2006–07 Wichita State Shockers men's basketball team represented Wichita State University in the 2006–07 NCAA Division I men's basketball season. The team plays in the Missouri Valley Conference (MVC) and was led by head coach Mark Turgeon in his seventh and final year.

Missouri Valley Conference standings

References 

Wichita State
Wichita State Shockers men's basketball seasons
Wichita State Shockers men's basketball
Wichita State Shockers men's basketball